Garcinia xanthochymus, the false mangosteen, gamboge, yellow mangosteen, Himalayan Garcinia, or sour mangosteen  is a species of mangosteens found from India, southern China, and Japan through Indochina to Peninsular Malaysia at elevations of 0 - 1400 meters. Plants are found growing in humid forests of valleys or on hills. It is locally known as defol (ডেফল) in Bengal,  tepor tenga (টেপৰ টেঙা) in Assam, and heirangoi (হৈরাংগোই) in Manipur.

Description
Tree growing up to 8-15 meters with gray brow bark. Leaves are oblong to lanceolate, 15.4-30.5 cm x  (4-)6-12 cm. Petioles are robust 1.5-2.5 cm long. Flowers are greenish white, monoecious in a dense cluster of 4-10 with a diameter of 1.3 cm. Fruits are yellow 5 cm to 8.9 cm in diameter containing yellow flesh and around 5 seeds. Seeds are oblong or ovoid and brown. Plants bloom from March to May with fruits forming around August to November.

References

External links
 
 

xanthochymus